Single principle of Pancasila was a policy enacted by the New Order regime under President Soeharto in 1985 compelling political parties and public organisations to declare the national ideology of Pancasila as their "one and only ideological basis".

History 
On the speech delivered before the MPR RI plenary session on 16 August 1982, President Soeharto emphasised that all social and political forces must declare Pancasila as their only ideological basis.

The policy was then formulated in the MPR RI resolution No. II/MPR/1983 elucidating State Policy Guidelines which stated that political parties and the Functional Groups (Official term for Golkar Party) must be the formidable political and social might that have Pancasila as their one and only ideology maintain and preserve the national ideology.

Political parties and the Functional Groups became the first institution with an obligation to adhere to the single principle basis, per Law No. 3 of 1983 on Political Parties. The obligation was extended to all public organisations through Law No. 8 of 1985 on Public Organisation passed on 17 June 1985. 

Following the fall of the New Order in 1998, political liberalisation resulted in the abolition of the single-principle requirement for political parties and mass organisations.

Response 
The single-principle obligation received mixed reaction among Indonesian Muslims. While major Muslim organisations Muhammadiyah and Nahdlatul Ulama (NU) endorsed the single-principle basis, independent Muslim activists rejected the obligation.

NU argued that Pancasila consist of values that are not in opposite to Islam. Furthermore, at the NU Congress in 1984, the organisation issued a resolution affirming the final status of Pancasila, which they said merely a philosophical value and will not replace the religion, and the 1945 Constitution. However, NU also declared their withdrawal from politics at the same congress and decided to focus on social works, which they continue until now.

Meanwhile, Muhammadiyah also accepted the obligation by pointing out that Muhammadiyah figures, such as Ki Bagus Hadikusumo, Kahar Muzakkir, and Kasman Singodimedjo, participated in the formulation of Pancasila before the independence declaration on 17 August 1945.

In the opposite, Muslim activists who aspired to establish an Islamic state in Indonesia, rejected the single-principle obligation. As the result, some of them were jailed by the authority, or escaped overseas to avoid arrest. Abu Bakar Baasyir left Indonesia and stayed in Malaysia in a self-imposed exile for 17 years after being arrested for his rejection to the policy. Ba'asyir returned to Indonesia only after the fall of Suharto in 1998.

References

Notes

New Order (Indonesia)